"Till I Get My Way"/"Girl Is on My Mind" is a double A-side single by American rock band The Black Keys. It features the songs Till I Get My Way" and "Girl Is on My Mind" from their third studio album Rubber Factory. It was released on November 22, 2004. "Girl Is on My Mind" was written by the group after the members repeatedly listened to the song "Shot Down" by fellow garage rock band The Sonics.

Cultural references
"Girl Is on My Mind" was used in a Sony Ericsson advertisement, which starred tennis players Ana Ivanovic and Daniela Hantuchová. The commercial helped make the band more well-known. It also featured on the 2006 film Cashback.

Track listing
All songs were written by Dan Auerbach and Patrick Carney.
Till I Get My Way" (2:31)
"Girl Is on My Mind" (3:28)
"Flash of Silver" (previously unreleased)

Personnel
Dan Auerbach – guitars, vocals
Patrick Carney – drums

Charts

References

The Black Keys songs
2004 songs
Songs written by Dan Auerbach
Songs written by Patrick Carney
Split singles